Adriano da Silva Barros Júnior (born 22 August 1999), commonly known as Adriano, is a Brazilian footballer who plays as a midfielder for Botafogo-PB.

Career statistics

Club

Honours
 Atlético Mineiro
 Campeonato Mineiro: 2020

References

1999 births
Living people
Brazilian footballers
Association football midfielders
Clube Atlético Mineiro players
Criciúma Esporte Clube players
Paraná Clube players
Associação Desportiva Confiança players
Botafogo Futebol Clube (PB) players
Campeonato Brasileiro Série B players
Campeonato Brasileiro Série C players
People from Anápolis
Sportspeople from Goiás